T Pradeep (born 29 November 1994) is an Indian cricketer. He made his Twenty20 debut for Karnataka in the 2016–17 Inter State Twenty-20 Tournament on 31 January 2017. He made his List A debut for Karnataka in the 2016–17 Vijay Hazare Trophy on 25 February 2017. He made his first-class debut on 9 December 2019, for Railways in the 2019–20 Ranji Trophy.

References

External links
 

1994 births
Living people
Indian cricketers
Karnataka cricketers
Railways cricketers
Place of birth missing (living people)